Ejinaspis is a genus of trilobite.  It was described from Upper Cambrian fossils found in Inner Mongolia, China in 1986. The genus is placed in the family Solenopleuridae.

References

Solenopleuridae
Ptychopariida genera
Cambrian trilobites of Asia
Fossils of China

Cambrian genus extinctions